The 2010 Super 14 season kicked off in February 2010 with pre-season matches held from mid-January. It finished on 29 May. The 2010 season was the fifth and last season of the expanded Super 14 format. The schedule, which covers 3½ months, featured a total of 94 matches, with each team playing one full round-robin against the 13 other teams, two semi-finals and a final. Every team received one bye over the 14 rounds.

Table

Referees
The referees for this tournament came from all three of the participating nations. Referees are ranked by Merit and Reserve Panels. They can be promoted or demoted to another panel. At least eighty Percent of the Super 14 games will be refereed by the Merit Panel Referees.

Australian Referees
Stuart Dickinson (Merit Panel)
Steve Walsh (Reserve Panel)
 Ian Smith (Reserve Panel)
 Nathan Pearce (Reserve Panel)
 Paul Marks (Reserve Panel)- Stood down from panel, following reviews of his performances at the end of Week 4. He was re-included on the reserve panel for Round 14.

New Zealand Referees
Bryce Lawrence (Merit Panel)
 Chris Pollock (Merit Panel)
 Keith Brown (Merit Panel)
 Garratt Williamson (Reserve Panel)
 Jonathan White (Reserve Panel)
 Vinny Munro (Reserve Panel)

South African Referees
Craig Joubert (Merit Panel)
Jonathan Kaplan (Merit Panel)
Marius Jonker (Merit Panel)
Mark Lawrence (Merit Panel)
 Jaco Peyper (Reserve Panel)
 Pro Legoete (Reserve Panel)- Stood down from panel, following reviews of his performances at the end of Week 4

Results

Round 1 

A Super Rugby record was set when the Hurricanes kicked 9 penalty goals in total throughout the match, 5 to Willie Ripia and 4 to Piri Weepu.

Stirling Mortlock became the first player in Super Rugby to score over 1,000 points in this match.

Round 2

This match set several new Super Rugby records including the highest aggregate score in a single match (137 points), highest score by an away side (72) and the most tries scored in a Super Rugby match (18).

Round 3

Round 4

Round 5

Round 6

Round 7

Round 8

Round 9

In this match, Dan Carter became the all-time leading points scorer in Super Rugby history.

Round 10

Round 11

Round 12

As a result of this match, the Stormers became the first South African team to beat every New Zealand based team in the regular Super 12/14 season.

Round 13

Round 14

As a result of this match, the Lion holds the record for most losses in one season, with 13 straight losses. They also became the second team in Super Rugby history to lose all their round robin matches, joining the Bulls side of 2002.

Finals

Semi-finals

Final
The Final of the 2010 Super 14 season took place on 29 May 2010 at Orlando Stadium in Soweto, South Africa. The Bulls, based in Pretoria, hosted the Stormers, from Cape Town, in the second all-South African final. The defending champion Bulls won 25–17 to claim their second consecutive title and third in four years. This was the last Super 14 final, as the Melbourne Rebels joined the Super Rugby competition in the 2011 season to create a new Super Rugby competition.

The Bulls' normal home, Loftus Versfeld, was unavailable because it was used as a venue for the 2010 FIFA World Cup being held in South Africa beginning 11 June. Under FIFA rules, all World Cup venues must be handed over to the local organisers no later than 15 days before the opening match of the competition. Orlando Stadium was the largest, suitable, stadium in the Bulls' home province of Gauteng that was not being used for the World Cup.

The game was surrounded in controversy after Schalk Burger claimed that the referee Craig Joubert was inconsistent at the breakdowns, "coaching the Bulls, but penalising the Stormers". This sparked an outcry over the handling of the game by Joubert, and internet blogs were buzzing due to the alleged incompetency of Joubert. André Watson, the head of South Africa's Rugby Referees, released a statement in which he defended Joubert's performance.

Player statistics

Leading try scorers

Leading point scorers

Attendances

See also

 Super 14 franchise areas
 List of Super Rugby records

References

External links
 
 
 
 2010 Super 14 Trial Games

 
2010
 
 
 
2010 rugby union tournaments for clubs